John Meikle  (11 September 1898 – 20 July 1918) was a Scottish recipient of the Victoria Cross, the highest and most prestigious award for valour in the face of the enemy that can be awarded to British and Commonwealth forces.

Life
Born in Kirkintilloch, Dunbartonshire, Meikle's family later moved to Nitshill, on the south side of Glasgow. Here, after leaving school, he worked as a clerk at the ticket office of Nitshill railway station.

In February 1915 he enlisted in the Seaforth Highlanders, joining the 4th battalion in France in July 1916. He was serving as a lance-corporal at the Third Battle of Ypres when he won the Military Medal for bravery on 20 September 1917 at the Battle of the Menin Road Ridge.

VC action
Meikle was a 19 years old sergeant in the 4th Battalion, Seaforth Highlanders, British Army during the First World War when the following deed took place on 20 July 1918 near Marfaux, France, during the Second Battle of the Marne for which he was awarded the VC.

Meikle is buried at Marfaux British Cemetery, maintained by the Commonwealth War Graves Commission, in the Marne department of France.

Memorial
A memorial to John Meikle stands outside Dingwall railway station. The inscription reads: "In memory of Sergt John Meikle V.C M.M late clerk at Nitshill Station who enlisted in H.M. Forces (Seaforth Highlanders) 8th February 1915 during the Great War and was killed in action on 20th July 1918. Erected by his railway comrades".

The memorial was originally erected at Nitshill railway station in 1920, where, over the decades, it suffered vandalism. It was then moved to Levern Primary School in Nitshill, the local school Meikle had attended, and was on display in the school entrance for many years. When the school was to be demolished in 1997 the Head Teacher, Margaret Gallagher, contacted the Railway Authorities to enable the memorial to be saved for posterity. It now stands outside Dingwall station, while a new memorial, funded by the Railway Heritage Trust, was unveiled at Nitshill Station on 18 October 2016.

Meikle's medals, including the Victoria Cross, are displayed at Dingwall Museum in Ross-Shire.

References

 Monuments to Courage (David Harvey, 1999)
 The Register of the Victoria Cross (This England, 1997)
 Scotland's Forgotten Valour (Graham Ross, 1995)
 VCs of the First World War: Spring Offensive 1918 (Gerald Gliddon, 1997)

1898 births
1918 deaths
British World War I recipients of the Victoria Cross
Recipients of the Military Medal
Seaforth Highlanders soldiers
British Army personnel of World War I
British military personnel killed in World War I
People from Kirkintilloch
British Army recipients of the Victoria Cross